Robert James Waller (August 1, 1939 – March 10, 2017) was an American author best known for The Bridges of Madison County, an enormously successful book in 1993.  He was also a photographer and musician.

Life
Robert James Waller Jr. was born in Charles City, Iowa, and grew up in Rockford, Iowa. Waller received his BA ('62) and MA ('64) from University of Northern Iowa (then known as Iowa State Teachers College). He received his PhD in business from the Kelley School of Business at Indiana University Bloomington in 1968.

Later that year he returned to UNI and began teaching management and economics, and in 1977 became a full professor. He became dean of the College of Business in 1980 and retired from that position in 1986. It was announced in 2000 that he made a "seven figure" donation to Indiana University.

Several of his books have been on the New York Times bestseller list including 1992's The Bridges of Madison County which was the top best-seller in 1993. Both that novel and his 1995 novel, Puerto Vallarta Squeeze, have been made into motion pictures.

Personal life
In 1997, his marriage of 35 years to Georgia ended in divorce.

An article in People Magazine noted, "The parallels between Waller's life and his art—his Bridges heroine, farmwife Francesca, sacrifices her chance for happiness with a globe-hopping photographer in order to stay home and shield her loved ones from small-town scandal—haven't been lost on the locals".

Career 
Before becoming a writer, Waller worked as a professor of business administration at the University of Northern Iowa. He taught at the university for many years and later served as the founding dean of the College of Business. In addition to his teaching and administrative duties, Waller was also the director of the university's International Business Institute.

Death
Waller died on March 10, 2017, at his home in Fredericksburg, Texas. He was 77 and had been battling multiple myeloma.

Works

Novels

The Bridges of Madison County (1992; original UK title Love in Black and White)
Slow Waltz in Cedar Bend (1993); 
Puerto Vallarta Squeeze (1995)
Border Music (1995)
A Thousand Country Roads: An Epilogue to The Bridges of Madison County (2002)
High Plains Tango (2005)
The Long Night of Winchell Dear (2007)

Collections
Just Beyond the Firelight (1988), Iowa State University Press; 1st edition (1988), /

Non-fiction

One Good Road is Enough (1990)
Iowa: Perspectives on Today and Tomorrow (1991)
Old Songs in a New Café (1994)
Images (1994) 
The Summer Nights Never End...Until They Do: Life, Liberty, and the Lure of the Short-Run (2012)

Music
The Ballads of Madison County: a Collection of Songs; Audio CD (July 23, 1993); Atlantic Records 82511.

References

1939 births
2017 deaths
University of Northern Iowa alumni
Kelley School of Business alumni
20th-century American novelists
21st-century American novelists
American male novelists
American romantic fiction novelists
Novelists from Iowa
Atlantic Records artists
People from Floyd County, Iowa
University of Northern Iowa faculty
Deaths from cancer in Texas
Deaths from multiple myeloma
20th-century American male writers
21st-century American male writers